
The Wabash Pittsburgh Terminal was a railroad station located in Pittsburgh, Pennsylvania, United States. Constructed in 1903 and opened on April 13, 1904, the 11 floor Beaux-Arts domed 197 foot tall terminal was designed by  Theodore Carl Link and cost George Jay Gould $800,000 ($ in  dollars).  Floors 1 through 3 contained ticketing, passenger waiting areas and some retail with floors 4 and above serving hundreds of offices of Gould's Wabash Railway Corporation. The terminal lasted only four years as a Wabash Railroad terminal when the Wabash Pittsburgh Terminal Railway entered receivership on May 29, 1908. The Wabash would go on to lose both this railway and end affiliation with the Wheeling and Lake Erie Railway. The terminal continued to service passenger traffic until October 31, 1931, but survived beyond that as an office building and freight-only facility. The adjacent freight warehouse was closed after two successive fires on March 6, and March 22, 1946 destroyed most of the infrastructure. The station was announced for demolition on July 5, 1953 to make way for the  Gateway Center complex. Demolition started on October 5, 1953 and was completed in early 1954.

See also
Pittsburgh & Lake Erie Railroad Station
Grant Street Station
Union Station (Pittsburgh)
Baltimore and Ohio Station (Pittsburgh)

References

Further reading

External links

Hi-Res image of Wabash Terminal

Railway stations in the United States opened in 1904
Demolished railway stations in the United States
Demolished buildings and structures in Pittsburgh
Former Wabash Railroad stations
Railway stations in Pittsburgh
History of Pittsburgh
Railway stations closed in 1931
Buildings and structures demolished in 1953